A list of films produced in France in 1956.

See also
 1956 in France
 1956 in French television

References

External links
 French films of 1956 at the Internet Movie Database
French films of 1956 at Cinema-francais.fr

1956
Films
French